Enterprise Elementary School District is an elementary school district in Redding, California, United States. It covers a large portion of Redding's east side. The school district has eight elementary schools and one junior high school. Brian Winstead is the current superintendent.

History 
Enterprise Elementary School District participated in a statewide California school strike against COLA (Cost of Living Adjustments) in 2006.

Schools 
The schools in this district:
Parsons Junior High School
Alta Mesa Elementary School
Boulder Creek Elementary School
Even Start Elementary School
June Street Elementary School
Lassen View Elementary School
Mistletoe Elementary School
Rother Elementary School
Shasta Meadows Elementary School

References

External links
 

School districts in Shasta County, California